Rewan is a given name. Notable people with the name include:

 Rewan Amin (born 1996), Dutch footballer
 Rewan Refaei (born 1996), Egyptian taekwondo practitioner

See also
 Rowan (name)
 Rewan, Queensland, a rural locality in Queensland, Australia
 Rewan air crash, an air crash in Rewan, Queensland

Feminine given names
Masculine given names